Ebrahimi v Westbourne Galleries Ltd [1973] AC 360 is a United Kingdom company law case on the rights of minority shareholders. The case was decided in the House of Lords.

Facts
Mr Ebrahimi and Mr Nazar were partners. They decided to incorporate as the business was highly successful, buying and selling expensive rugs. Their store was originally in Nottingham, and then moved to London at 220 Westbourne Grove.

Mr Ebrahimi and Mr Nazar were the sole shareholders in the company. All profits were paid as directorial compensation. No dividends were ever issued. A few years later, when Mr Nazar's son came of age, he was appointed to the board of directors and Mr Ebrahimi and Mr Nazar both transferred shares to him.

After a falling out between the directors Mr Nazar and son called a company meeting, at which they passed an ordinary resolution to have Mr Ebrahimi removed as a director. Mr Ebrahimi, clearly unhappy at this, applied to the court for a remedy to have the company wound up.

Judgment
The House of Lords stated that as a company is a separate legal person, the court would not normally entertain such an application. However, they believed that as the company was so similar in its operation as it was when it was a partnership, they created what is now known as a quasi-partnership. Mr Ebrahimi had a legitimate expectation that his management function would continue and that the articles would not be used against him in this way. Based on the personal relationship between the parties it would be inequitable to allow Mr Nazar and his son to use their rights against Mr Ebrahimi so as to force him out of the company and so it was just and equitable to wind it up. The company was wound up and Mr Ebrahimi received his capital interest.

Lord Wilberforce gave the following judgment.

Significance
Soon after the remedy for unfair prejudice was introduced, which allows a court to simply order a minority shareholder to be bought out, rather than a company being wound up. This is found in the Companies Act 2006 sections 994 to 996.

See also
O'Neill v Phillips
Unfair prejudice

External links
Robert Yalden, Business organizations: principles, policies and practice, 2008, Emond Montgomery Publication. pp931–9.

United Kingdom company case law
Lord Wilberforce cases
House of Lords cases
1972 in British law
1972 in case law